Classical Variations and Themes is the first studio album by former Stratovarius guitarist Timo Tolkki, released in 1994 through Goldenworks Ky (Europe) and Victor Entertainment (Japan); and reissued in 2004 through Irond Records.

Background
The album is primarily instrumental (save for two tracks, "Fire Dance Suite" and "Soldiers Prayer", on which Tolkki sings) and bears similar heavy metal and progressive metal elements to previous Stratovarius albums. Keyboard and drums are performed by Tolkki's then-Stratovarius bandmates Antti Ikonen and Tuomo Lassila, respectively. "Fire Dance Suite" was originally composed for Stratovarius in 1986, and would later be included on their 1997 compilation album The Past and Now. A music video for the song was also released.

Track listing

Personnel
Timo Tolkki – vocals, guitar, guitar synthesizer, bass, engineering, production
Antti Ikonen – keyboard
Tuomo Lassila – drums
Mikko Karmila – mixing

References

Timo Tolkki albums
1994 debut albums
Victor Entertainment albums